MALÉV Ltd., which did business as MALÉV Hungarian Airlines (abbreviated MALÉV), was the flag carrier of Hungary from 1946 until 2012. Its head office was in Budapest, with its main hub at Budapest Ferenc Liszt International Airport. The airline flew to over 50 cities in 34 countries with a fleet of 22 aircraft. Malév joined the Oneworld alliance on 29 March 2007. On 3 February 2012, Malév ceased operations and on 14 February 2012 was declared insolvent by the Metropolitan Court of Budapest.

History

Beginnings
Hungarian civil aviation was pioneered by airlines such as Aero Rt. (founded 1910), Magyar Aeroforgalmi Rt. (Maefort) and Magyar Légiforgalmi Rt. (MALÉRT (mɒleːrt)). The widespread devastation of World War II forced these airlines to suspend airline service in 1940–44, and they were ultimately replaced by Maszovlet as the national airline after the war. Maszovlet was founded on 29 March 1946, as the Hungarian-Soviet Civil Air Transport Joint Stock Company (Magyar-Szovjet Polgári Légiforgalmi Rt. also known as MASZOVLET), as a merger between Malert, Maefort and the Hungarian part of Aeroflot.

The initial fleet consisted of 21-seat Li-2 passenger aircraft (the Soviet-licensed DC-3) and 3-seat Po-2 "taxis", used for precision air mail: sacks of mail were dropped from the aircraft when flying over its destination. In 1950, Malév's operating base moved from Budaörs to the newly opened airport at Ferihegy, where it remained.

On 25 November 1954, Hungary acquired all the Soviet shares of MASZOVLET, and renamed the company MALÉV. Ilyushin Il-14 twin piston-engined transport aircraft were acquired in the late 1950s. Operations were expanded, with flights extending to nearby countries and, following the 1965 acquisition of Ilyushin Il-18 turbine propeller airliners, and the subsequent 1968 purchase of jet-powered Tupolev Tu-134s from the Soviet Union, across Europe and the Middle East. In the summer of 1974, the Tupolev-154 was brought into scheduled service.

Even before the political changes of 1989 and the arrival of democracy, Malév had begun phasing out its Soviet-era planes with the introduction of the airline's first Western-designed aircraft, a Boeing 737-200 on 18 November 1988. With that, Malév was the second airline in the then-communist COMECON countries of Central Europe to operate a Western-built aircraft. (TAROM – Romanian Airlines started operating the BAC 1-11 in 1968 and the Boeing 707 in 1974. LOT – Polish Airlines was the third with its Boeing 767-300 aircraft launched in April 1989).

The company's logo, which turned out to be its last, was designed by graphic designer László Zsótér (DLA) in 1986 and consecutively adopted during the following years.

1990s–2007: Modernisation
The last Soviet-built Tupolev Tu-154 aircraft was withdrawn from service in 2001. In 2003, MALÉV began replacing its Boeing 737 Classic aircraft with 737 Next-Generation planes. It then ran a fleet of 18 Boeing 737 Next Generations, as well as 4 Bombardier Dash 8 Q-400s for short-haul routes.

From 1999 to 2007, the Hungarian State Privatization Company ÁPV Plc. (Állami Privatizációs és Vagyonkezelő Rt.) owned 99.5% of Malév shares. The other 0.5% were in the hands of small shareholders. József Váradi was CEO from 1999-2003. He later founded Wizz Air. ÁPV Plc. repeatedly tried to privatise Malév, finally selling it to AirBridge Zrt.

2007–2011: In private hands
AirBridge acquired 99.9% of the airline in February 2007. It had 1,785 staff members, as of 31 December 2007.

Despite Czech Airlines' offer to sponsor Malév as an associate member of the SkyTeam alliance, and MALÉV's codeshare agreements with several SkyTeam carriers, Malév joined Oneworld on 29 March 2007.

On 12 July 2007, Lloyd Paxton was appointed CEO of MALÉV. Paxton replaced János Gönci, who remained on the board of directors as an adviser. Paxton was the first MALÉV CEO to come from the airline industry. He had been with British Airways for over 35 years and more recently with Air Astana. Two months later, on 14 September 2007, Lloyd Paxton resigned as CEO of MALÉV, replaced by Péter Leonov. In January 2009, Ballo Anatoly Borisovich became the chairman.

On 18 March 2009, the Russian state-owned Vneshekonombank took a minority stake of 49% in AirBridge Zrt which held the shares of the struggling airline. The majority, 51%, remained in Hungarian ownership. The managing control would be taken by Russia's Aeroflot – Russian Airlines. Martin Gauss, former CEO of DBA and Cirrus Airlines as well as a Boeing 737 pilot was elected as CEO on 15 April 2009. During the management of Martin Gauss, MALÉV reached a load factor above industry average among "traditional" airlines, comparable of that of low-cost airlines. One of the reasons of the departure of Martin Gauss as CEO of MALÉV was the benefit ceiling established by the newly elected government, led by Orban Viktor, in 2010, where a ceiling of €8000 gross salary (approx €5000 net) was set for all managers, governing state-owned companies.

The airline was renationalised in February 2010, with Hungarian Government state holding company MNV acquiring a 95% stake in the airline. The remaining 5% remained with AirBridge. In December 2010, the European Commission began an investigation into illegal government subsidies of Malév.

2012: Financial collapse and cessation of operations

On 9 January 2012, the European Union considered the state aid received by MALÉV illegal and ordered Hungary to recover it from the company. The European Commission ordered MALÉV to repay various forms of state aid received from 2007 to 2010, totalling 38 billion forints (€130 m; $171 m), a sum equal to its entire 2010 revenue. At the end of January 2012, MALÉV announced that it could no longer fund its own operations, and requested more subsidies from the Hungarian government. After having two planes seized at foreign airports by creditors, MALÉV immediately ceased all flight activity on 3 February 2012, after 66 years of continuous operation. The airline's total debts were 60 billion forints (US$270.5 million) at the time of shutdown. The shutdown occurred at 6 AM Western European Time on 3 February 2012. On 14 February 2012, the Metropolitan Court of Budapest declared MALÉV Ltd. insolvent. Hitelintézeti Felszámoló Nonprofit Kft. (Credit Institutional Liquidator Nonprofit Ltd.) received the appointment as the liquidator of MALÉV Ltd.

Corporate affairs
Before its closure, the airline had 2,600 employees and almost half of the air traffic at Budapest Ferenc Liszt International Airport. In 2011 about 40% of the revenues at Budapest airport originated from Malév operations, and during that year the airline served 3.2 million passengers.

Head office

MALÉV's head office was located inside the Lurdy House (Lurdy Ház) in Budapest., an office and shopping complex that opened in 1998. Previously the airline head office was located elsewhere in Budapest. In the 1960s and 1970s it was in V. Vörösmarty-tér 5, and in the 1990s it was in Roosevelt tér 2. The airline signed a lease agreement in the spring of 2011 with Budapest Ferenc Liszt International Airport agreeing to relocate its headquarters to three office buildings between Terminal 1 and Terminal 2 in the airport by the summer of 2012, but these plans were cancelled due to the shutdown.

Ownership
The airline was privatised in the 1990s. In December 1993, ÁPV Plc. sold 40,316 "A" series shares to the airline's employees. In 1998 ÁPV Plc. held 64.089% of the company (4,929,954 shares), Alitalia-Linee Aeree Italiane held 30% (2,307,693 shares), Simest held 5% (384,615 shares), private entities held 0.333% (25,577 shares), and several local governments held the rest of the company. Local governments with stakes in Malév were Agárd, Balatonlelle, Budapest, Debrecen, Budapest District 5, and Budapest District 18.

In 2007 the Russian brothers Alexander and Boris Abramovich acquired 49% of AirBridge Zrt as part of a privatisation program of the Hungarian government. After the AiRUnion alliance of the Abramovich brothers went bankrupt in 2009, Vnesheconombank took over the Abramovich stake.

The government of Hungary re-nationalized the airline on 26 February 2010, after Malev experienced changes in ownership and financial difficulties. The government held 95% of the airline while AirBridge Zrt held 5%. AirBridge Zrt was 51% owned by Kálmán Kiss and Magdolna Költő, two Hungarian individuals (very likely straw owners), and 49% owned by Boris Abramovich. Prior to 26 February 2010, AirBridge Zrt held 99.95% of Malév and minor shareholders held 0.05%.

Destinations

MALÉV Hungarian Airlines offered scheduled services to about fifty destinations in Europe and the Middle East; charter flights were also flown. Flights to Africa, East Asia, and North America had been terminated. Services on the Budapest-Toronto and Budapest-New York-JFK routes were suspended in mid-November 2007. Then, on 23 July 2008, MALÉV announced the cancellation of the New York and Toronto flights; these had been operated since the early 1990s.

Codeshare agreements
Malév Hungarian Airlines had codeshare agreements with the following airlines, beside oneworld members:

Fleet

Final fleet

MALÉV's fleet consisted of the following aircraft at the time of its shutdown on 3 February 2012:

Retired fleet
Over the years, Malév had in the past operated a variety of aircraft, including:

Incidents and accidents

 23 December 1954 A MALÉV Lisunov Li-2P (HA-LIF) force-landed near Polná, Czechoslovakia (now Czech Republic) due to icing; while landing, the left landing gear collapsed; all 33 on board survived (one person was injured), but the aircraft was written off. On the same day another Malév Li-2P (HA-LII) belly-landed near Bratroňov, Czechoslovakia (now Czech Republic) due to icing; all 19 on board survived, but the aircraft was also written off.
 13 July 1956  MALÉV Flight 622, a Lisunov Li-2T (HA-LIG) was hijacked by seven people who demanded to be taken to West Germany; the aircraft landed safely at Ingolstadt Air Base with no casualties to the 20 passengers and crew on board.
 13 October 1956 MALÉV Lisunov Li-2P (HA-LID) was hijacked shortly after takeoff from Szombathely Airport by four armed men who wanted to be flown to the West; of the 19 on board, one died and two were injured.
 6 August 1961 MALÉV Douglas TS-62 (HA-TSA) crashed in a residential area in Budapest while on a sightseeing flight due to crew negligence and loss of control, killing all 27 on board and another three on the ground.
 23 November 1962  MALÉV Airlines Flight 355, an Ilyushin Il-18V (HA-MOD), crashed at Le Bourget Airport, probably as the result of a stall; all 21 on board died.
 17 February 1964 MALÉV VEB 14P HA-MAH was burnt out in a hangar fire at Ferihegy Airport.
 19 November 1969 MALÉV Tupolev Tu-134 (HA-LBA), overran the runway on landing at Atatürk Airport, collapsing the landing gear and injuring the navigator (in the nose); there were no other casualties, but the aircraft was written off.
 28 August 1971 MALÉV Airlines Flight 731, an Ilyushin Il-18V (HA-MOC), crashed into the sea on approach to Copenhagen Airport, killing 32; 2 survived. Dezső Szentgyörgyi, who was piloting the Il-18V at the time of the crash and also the top-scoring Hungarian ace of World War II, was among those who were killed.
 16 September 1971MALÉV Airlines Flight 110, operated by Tupolev Tu-134 HA-LBD, crashed near Boryspil International Airport, Kiev in bad weather, following two missed approaches, after a generator failure caused the crew to switch to batteries; all 49 on board died.
 15 January 1975 MALÉV Flight 801 operated by Ilyushin Il-18V HA-MOH, was being ferried from East Berlin to Budapest when it crashed on approach to Ferihegy Airport due to weather, poor visibility, poor CRM and possible spatial disorientation, killing the nine crew.
 30 September 1975 MALÉV Tupolev Tu-154 aircraft on the Budapest to Beirut route crashed near the Lebanese shoreline. See Malév Flight 240.
 21 September 1977 MALÉV Airlines Flight 203, a Tupolev Tu-134 (HA-LBC), flying from Istanbul to Budapest with an intermediate stop at Bucharest struck level ground on approach, probably as a result of flying at reduced power, unnoticed by the crew. Of the 53 on board, 29 died.
 29 March 1989 Two teenagers from Czechoslovakia armed with grenades and shotguns hijacked Flight 640 at Prague Ruzyně Airport, and flew the Tupolev Tu-154B with 15 hostages to Frankfurt Airport before surrendering.
 4 July 2000 MALÉV Flight 262, a chartered MALÉV Tu-154 HA-LCR, landed on its belly at Thessaloniki Airport in Greece. The crew had not successfully lowered the landing gear and the aircraft skidded  on the runway. The aircraft was able to become airborne again as the pilots applied full throttle. It circled until the crew managed to lower the landing gear and landed safely. There were no injuries, but the aircraft was written off, and is now used for fire training.
 13 February 2009 MALÉV Flight 440 from Budapest made an emergency landing at its destination Skopje Airport in North Macedonia. At 16:05 the pilot reported right engine failure of the Bombardier Dash 8 Q400 whilst on final approach. The pilot safely landed the airplane and there were no injuries to the 64 passengers. The General Manager of Skopje Airport confirmed the incident.
 25 June 2011MALÉV Airlines Flight 906, operated by Boeing 737-800 HA-LOC, from Budapest to Heraklion International Airport, suffered a tail strike during landing. None of the 180 passengers and 7 crew were hurt but the aircraft was seriously damaged. The incident was later attributed to pilot error.

See also

 List of airports in Hungary
 Transport in Hungary

References

External links

 Malév Hungarian Airlines  
 A Malév Zrt. sajtóközleménye 
  (Archive)
  (Archive) 

 
Defunct airlines of Hungary
Association of European Airlines members
Airlines established in 1946
Hungarian brands
Airlines disestablished in 2012
Former Oneworld members
1946 establishments in Hungary
2012 disestablishments in Hungary